Rezay is a commune in the Cher department in the Centre-Val de Loire region of France.

Geography
The commune borders the department of Indre.

Population

Sights
 The romanesque church of Notre-Dame, rebuilt in the nineteenth century.

See also
Communes of the Cher department

References

External links

Annuaire Mairie website 

Communes of Cher (department)